Rufous-sided towhee may refer to two different species that were previously considered one species:

 Eastern towhee, Pipilo erythrophthalmus
 Spotted towhee, Pipilo maculatus

Birds by common name